Hollersbach im Pinzgau is a municipality in the district of Zell am See (Pinzgau region), in the state of Salzburg in Austria.   The population (as of May 2001) is 1159.

Overview
Yearly, in the end of September, it holds a festival that celebrates the time when the cows come down from the alps (where they stay during the warm seasons) to the stables in the city where they stay during the winter.

Economy 
Its main economic activities are tourism and dairy farming.

In 2005 a cable-car that connects the city with the famous skiing region of Kitzbuehel was built, this brought a boost to real-estate in the municipality.

References

Cities and towns in Zell am See District